Free Youth may refer to:

Free Youth or Szabad ifjúság, Hungarian newspaper
Free Youth, protest group in 2020 Thai protests